Jasmine Grierson (born 16 May 1998) is an Australian rules footballer playing for Greater Western Sydney in the AFL Women's (AFLW) competition. She has previously played for Melbourne and North Melbourne.

AFLW career
Grierson was drafted by Melbourne with their eighteenth selection and 135th overall in the 2016 AFL Women's draft. After the six point win against  at Casey Fields in round four—in which she recorded sixteen disposals, five marks and two tackles—she was the round nominee for the AFLW Rising Star. She played every match in her debut season to finish with seven games.

Melbourne signed Grierson for the 2018 season during the trade period in May 2017.

In May 2018, Grierson was traded to North Melbourne.

In June 2021, Grierson was traded to Greater Western Sydney in exchange for pick #28.

Personal life
Grierson is currently studying a Bachelor of Psychological Science at Deakin University.

References

External links 

1998 births
Living people
Melbourne Football Club (AFLW) players
North Melbourne Football Club (AFLW) players
Australian rules footballers from Victoria (Australia)
Victorian Women's Football League players